Christidou is a surname, the feminine form of Christidis. Notable people with the surname include:

Rallia Christidou (born 1979), Greek singer
Sissi Christidou (born 1980), Greek television presenter and YouTuber

Greek-language surnames